The Okuyoshino Pumped Storage Power Station (奥吉野発電所) is located  north of Totsukawa in Nara Prefecture, Japan. To accomplish power generation, the power station shifts water between two reservoirs, the lower Asahi Reservoir and the upper Seto Reservoir. Construction on both the Asahi and Seto Dams began in 1971 and was complete in 1978. The power station was commissioned in 1980. Due to heavy sediment and turbidity in the Seto Reservoir, caused by logging and landslides upstream, a sediment bypass tunnel was constructed between 1992 and 1998.

Design and operation

Asahi Dam

Seto Dam
Creating the upper reservoir in a valley above the lower is the Seto Dam.

During periods of low demand when electricity is cheap, the power station pumps water from the lower reservoir to the upper. When energy demand is high, the water is released back down to the power station through the same tunnels to generate electricity. Additionally, the six  Francis pump-turbine-generators are reversible and serve to both pump water and generate electricity. The pumping and generation process is repeated as needed and although the power station consumes more electricity pumping than it does generating, pumping occurs when electricity is cheap and generating when it is expensive; making the power station economical.

Sediment bypass tunnel
To allow sediment to pass the lower Seto Reservoir, a bypass tunnel was constructed. It passes through rock on the north side of the reservoir. The weir is used to divert sediment-laden river water into the tunnel or to let it flow into the reservoir.

See also

List of pumped-storage hydroelectric power stations
List of power stations in Japan

References

Energy infrastructure completed in 1980
Hydroelectric power stations in Japan
Pumped-storage hydroelectric power stations in Japan